Nine Mile Creek Regional Trail is a , mixed-use path in Hennepin County, Minnesota, United States. It is maintained by the Three Rivers Park District. The trail features 8 separate boardwalks in  that traverse Nine Mile Creek and its marshes. It is predicted to serve 400,000 people yearly.

Route 

The trail begins in Hopkins at the Cedar Lake LRT Regional Trail and the Minnesota River Bluffs Regional Trail. It continues south through Hopkins and crosses the creek several times. It briefly ends at US 169 and detours on local streets. It resumes again in Edina and goes over several boardwalks. It passes through Walnut Ridge Park and soon after into Bredesen Park. It crosses behind two local schools, including the Edina High School and passes over another boardwalk. It makes its way to a newly constructed roundabout at Tracy Avenue and turns south. On the longest boardwalk of the trail, it passes just east of Heights Park, and parallels the Xcel Energy powerlines and the Canadian Pacific Railway. It passes under 70th Street, and weaves through an office area. It then crosses a local road and MN 100 on a  bridge. It parallels MN 100 and eventually goes east into the decommissioned Fred Richards Golf Course. It passes north of Centennial Lakes Park and into Adams Hill Park. It briefly turns south and then parallels 77th Street. It turns south eventually and turns east to cross I-35W at 76th Street. It continues east on this road and terminates at 12th Avenue.

History 
The trail was mostly constructed from 2000-2014 In Richfield and Bloomington, with most of the trail being on-road. In Edina, the trail was much harder to construct due to right-of-way issues and physical barriers such as roads and the creek itself. Construction required 19 easements and collaboration with Minnesota Department of Transportation and the city. The entire trail was built over the 100-year floodplain, including boardwalks and bridges. The entire trail was finished and opened on June 3, 2018.

See also
Bicycle commuting
Three Rivers Park District
Southwest LRT Trail

References

External links
 [http://www.threeriversparks.org/trails/minnesota-river-bluffs-trail.aspx Minnesota River Bluffs Trail

Rail trails in Minnesota
Parks in Minnesota
Transportation in Carver County, Minnesota
Transportation in Hennepin County, Minnesota